Khong (also Romanized as Khong, Honorable Khong, Khong-e Sharif, and Khung) is a village in Alqurat Rural District, in the Central District of Birjand County, South Khorasan Province, Iran. At the 2006 census, its population was 476, in 141 families.

Sources

 وب‌گاه‌روستای خنگ شریف

References 

Populated places in Birjand County